Kim Dyer (born February 1, 1947) is an American sports shooter. She competed at the 1984 Summer Olympics and the 1988 Summer Olympics.

References

External links
 

1947 births
Living people
American female sport shooters
Olympic shooters of the United States
Shooters at the 1984 Summer Olympics
Shooters at the 1988 Summer Olympics
People from San Angelo, Texas
Pan American Games medalists in shooting
Pan American Games gold medalists for the United States
Shooters at the 1983 Pan American Games
Medalists at the 1983 Pan American Games
21st-century American women
20th-century American women